Events from the year 1521 in France

Incumbents
 Monarch – Francis I

Events
 
 30 June – Battle of Esquiroz: French forces under Henri d'Albret, exiled King of Navarre, are defeated by the Spanish and forced to abandon their attempt to recover Henri's kingdom.
 23 November – Spanish–German–Papal forces under Prosper Colonna force French Marshal Odet de Lautrec to abandon Milan.

Births
 18 April – François de Coligny d'Andelot, French general (d. 1569)

Deaths

See also

References

1520s in France